The Ukraine men's national water polo team represents Ukraine in international men's water polo competitions. The team was established in 1992 after the collapse of the Soviet Union. The highest achievements in the history of independent Ukraine are 12th place at the 1996 Summer Olympics in Atlanta and 7th place at the 1995 European Championships in Vienna.

Results

Olympic Games
 1996 — 12th place

European Championship
 1993 — 11th place
 1995 — 7th place
 1997 — 11th place

Notable players
 Aleksei Barkalov
 Andriy Kovalenko
 Dmitri Stratan

References

Water polo
Men's national water polo teams
National water polo teams in Europe
National water polo teams by country